Yavuz Çoker (born 1936) is a Turkish footballer. He played in one match for the Turkey national football team in 1965.

References

External links
 

1936 births
Living people
Turkish footballers
Turkey international footballers
Place of birth missing (living people)
Association football defenders
Vefa S.K. footballers
Beşiktaş J.K. footballers
Sivasspor footballers